Kuangqu, or Kuang District may refer to:

Kuangqu, Yangquan, Shanxi, China
Bayan Obo Mining District, Inner Mongolia, China
Fengfeng Mining District, Hebei, China
Jingxing Mining District, Hebei, China
Yingshouyingzi Mining District, Hebei, China

Defunct:
Kuangqu, Datong, Shanxi, China (1970–2018)
Kuangqu, Xuzhou, Jiangsu, China (1965–95)

See also
Mining town